Mark Kruzan is the former mayor of Bloomington, Indiana, serving from January 3, 2004, to January 1, 2016.

Kruzan was elected as state representative for Bloomington in 1986. In 1994, he was appointed to be the House Minority Whip. In 1996, he was elected by his colleagues as Majority Leader of the Indiana House of Representatives.

References

External links

Bloomington Office of the Mayor official government website

Indiana Democrats
Mayors of Bloomington, Indiana
Living people
1960 births